DXAK (99.9 FM), broadcasting as 99.9 Bio Radio, is a radio station in the Philippines owned and operated by Karaga Biodiversity Linkages (KABILIN). Its studio and transmitter are located inside the Agusan del Sur State College of Agriculture and Technology campus, Bunawan.

References

Radio stations in Surigao del Sur
Radio stations established in 1998